"The Greatest Man I Never Knew" is a song written by Richard Leigh and Layng Martine Jr., and recorded by American country music artist Reba McEntire.  It released in July 1992 as the fourth and final single from her album For My Broken Heart.  The song reached No. 3 on the Billboard Hot Country Singles & Tracks chart in October 1992.

Content
Richard Leigh has described the song as being about his own father and that several other of his hit songs were also from his own life ("I'll Get Over You" and "Don't It Make My Brown Eyes Blue").

Chart performance

Year-end charts

References

1992 singles
Reba McEntire songs
Songs written by Richard Leigh (songwriter)
Songs written by Layng Martine Jr.
Song recordings produced by Tony Brown (record producer)
MCA Records singles
1991 songs